"Legendaddy" is the 19th episode of the sixth season of the CBS sitcom How I Met Your Mother and the 131st episode overall. It aired on March 21, 2011.

Plot

The gang goes to the house that Ted bought a year ago, where they hold an intervention for Barney for his behavior.

A few days before the intervention, the gang attempts to watch TV in Barney's apartment and they learn that Barney does not know how to use tools, so he has called a repairman to fix the TV. However, instead of the repairman, Barney is greeted at the door by Jerome "Jerry" Whittaker (John Lithgow), Barney's father who has received his letter. Later, Barney relates to the gang his meeting with Jerry, claiming he is a tour manager who loves Scotch, suits, and loose women as much as he does. However, Jerry reveals that he is actually a driving instructor with a normal suburban life. During the actual meeting with Barney, Jerry attempted to impress him but failed miserably.

The gang reveals that Barney's intervention is about seeing his father, who lives in the same area as Ted's house. Barney reluctantly agrees to have dinner with Jerry's family and meets Jerry's wife, Cheryl, and his son JJ. Barney acts antagonistically toward JJ until he learns that JJ stands for Jerome Junior. Upset, Barney abruptly leaves and Jerry follows him to the garage, where Barney is attempting to steal the basketball hoop attached to it. When Barney expresses his resentment that Jerry is nothing more than "some lame suburban dad", Jerry asks why this upsets him. Barney admits he is still hurt because Jerry had never been the responsible father he needed in his childhood. Jerry apologizes for abandoning Barney and helps him remove the hoop while teaching him how to use a screwdriver. Barney goes back to Ted's house with the group and gives the hoop to Ted, urging him to save it for his future kids, choking up as he says, "A kid needs a hoop."

Meanwhile, the gang begins to note all of the things that each of them never learned. Robin points that, until his class pointed it out, Ted used to think that the word "chameleon" was pronounced "Chama-lee-on". Ted points out that Robin was unaware that the North Pole is a real place until a marine biologist she was dating told her he was going there and she thought he was making it up. Later, it is revealed how she does not know that reindeer are real (despite being Canadian, where reindeer are found practically everywhere) or that Jack Kennedy and John F. Kennedy are the same person. Ted also points out Lily's bad throwing skills.

Marshall is the only one whom the gang does not mention, and he eventually asks the gang to pick on him. He reveals that he is aware that the gang has been careful around him ever since his father died, and says that he just wants to feel normal again. The group does resume picking on Marshall, mocking his inability to wink or swallow pills, his tendency to add too much water to his oatmeal, how he always misses one belt loop and how he is too old to ask to see the cockpit on planes. Marshall thanks them, grateful to be treated like an equal again.

Production
Co-executive producer Craig Thomas said the issue about the identity of Barney's real father was already a plot point in the initial conceptualization of the series. John Lithgow was the first choice to play Jerome Whittaker and the producers gave him a collection of specific episodes detailing Barney's father issues (including "Showdown") to help him get acquainted with the role. Thomas said Lithgow will still appear in future episodes, as the role would complicate Barney's connection with Nora.

Reception

Donna Bowman of the A.V. Club gave the episode a B.

Zach Oat of Television Without Pity graded the episode at B+

Robert Canning of IGN gave the episode a rating of 8 out of 10.

A number of reviews also praised Neil Patrick Harris' emotional scene with Lithgow.

References

External links

How I Met Your Mother (season 6) episodes
2011 American television episodes